Selçuk Öztürk (born 8 April 1972) is a Dutch politician of Turkish descent. He is a former member of the Labour Party (PvdA). Since 8 November 2012, he has been an MP. On 13 November 2014, Öztürk and Tunahan Kuzu left the Labor Party and have formed the Group Kuzu/Öztürk, later renamed DENK .

Öztürk was also a member of the provincial parliament of the province of Limburg between 11 March 2011 and 1 December 2012, and a member of the municipal council of Roermond from 1998 until 2013.

He stood down from Parliament at the 2021 general election

References 
  Parlement.com biography

1972 births
Living people
DENK politicians
Dutch people of Turkish descent
Dutch political party founders
Dutch Muslims
Independent politicians in the Netherlands
Labour Party (Netherlands) politicians
Members of the House of Representatives (Netherlands)
Members of the Provincial Council of Limburg
Municipal councillors in Limburg (Netherlands)
Party chairs of the Netherlands
People from Roermond
People from Şereflikoçhisar
Turkish emigrants to the Netherlands
21st-century Dutch politicians